The Witness is a short film (19 minutes) directed by Chris Gerolmo, starring Gary Sinise and Elijah Wood.

Plot
Set in a Nazi concentration camp, The Witness shows a series of repeating set of psychological actions.

Gary Sinise plays a guard, whose daily routine is to corral Jewish prisoners through a tunnel and into the gas chamber.  Each day, as he performs this task, the guard is watched by a Jewish little boy (Elijah Wood), whose piercing stare unsettles him. He tries to shake this child's steady glare, day after day, until one night he steals into the barracks, finds the child and smothers him.  Instead of being free of the accusing stare, another child has replaced the one he killed.

The Witness was produced in 1992 in the United States and is in the German language.

Cast
 Gary Sinise as Young Soldier
 Elijah Wood as Little Boy
 Ryan Alosio as Lt. Hummel
 Aaron Freeman as Another Kid
 Jono Gero as Paperwork Soldier #2
 Gregory Martin as Machine Gun Soldier #1
 John Sudol as Machine Gun Soldier #2
 Tim DeZarn as Paperwork Soldier #1 (as Tim De Zarn)

Home media
This film was one of four on a DVD released in Australia by the MRA Entertainment Group as Perverse Destiny, Vol 3.

See also 
List of Holocaust films

External links
 

1992 films
1992 short films
Holocaust films
1992 drama films
1990s German-language films
American drama short films
1990s American films